Dyschirius substriatus is a species of ground beetle in the subfamily Scaritinae. It was described by Duftschmid in 1812.

References

substriatus
Beetles described in 1812